Andrew Whittington (born 11 August 1993) is a former Australian professional tennis player. Whittington has now turned to coaching, he will be coaching former doubles partner and current professional Australian tennis player Alex Bolt for the upcoming 2022 summer. 
He made the world's top 200 in August 2016 following a semi-final run at the 2016 Kentucky Bank Tennis Championships.

His best performance came by reaching the quarter finals of the 2014 Australian Open with Alex Bolt.  In May 2014, Whittington and Bolt won the China International Challenger, which was both players' first Challenger doubles title. He made his singles grand slam debut at the 2017 Australian Open after being given a wild card.

Career

2010–2012: Career beginnings
Whittington made his first singles appearance in April 2010 at the Australian F3 where he lost in round 1 to Brendan Moore. Throughout 2010/11, Whittington played mostly on the ITF circuits across Australia and the USA where he reached two quarter finals in singles. In 2011, Whittington began partnering Luke Saville in doubles. The pair won back-to-back ITF doubles titles in November. The pair were given a wild card into the 2012 Australian Open Men's doubles. They lost in round 1. In March 2012, Whittington began partnering Alex Bolt; the pair won three ITF doubles titles before June.

Whittington made his first appearance in the singles main draw of an ATP Challenger Tour at Caloundra in February 2012, losing narrowly in round 1. The remainder of 2012 was spent on the ITF Circuit across Australia and Europe and he reached two semi-finals.

2013–2014: Doubles success 
In January 2013, Whittington was given a wild card into the Burnie Challenger where he reached the quarter finals, before playing ITF tour across USA and Europe. In April, Whittington reached his first final in Greece. He lost to Dimitar Kuzmanov in straight sets. He returned to Australia in September 2013 and lost in the final of the Australia F6 to Adam Feeney, before winning his first single title the following week at the F7 against Alex Bolt. Following the win, he told Tennis Australia “I’ve never felt like that before, I still feel like I’m out there playing.”  In November 2013, he won his second ITF title in Cambodia against Gavin van Peperzeel.

In doubles, Whittington played with a number of partners throughout 2013 but re-joined Alex Bolt in September and commenced a successful doubles run. The pair won three consecutive ITF doubles titles in Australia and in October, the pair reached their first Challenger final at the Melbourne Challenger, losing to Thanasi Kokkinakis and Benjamin Mitchell.

In January 2014,  Whittington lost in the first round of qualifying for the 2014 Brisbane International and 2014 Australian Open.

Whittington and Bolt were given wild cards into the Men's doubles. The pair defeated the number 3 seeds David Marrero and Fernando Verdasco in round two, ultimately losing at the quarter-final stage to number 8 seed Daniel Nestor and Nenad Zimonjić. The match was played on Rod Laver Arena; the pair's first appearance on centre court. The pair then made a series of semi-finals across Australia circuit before winning their first Challenger title in Anning in May. This increased Whittington's double ranking to within the world's top 100.

In June, Whittington and Bolt qualified for the 2014 Wimbledon Championships – Men's doubles, this was the pair's first appearance at Wimbledon. They lost in round 1 to Feliciano López and Jürgen Melzer.  In August, Whittington lost in the final of the Chinese Taipei F1 before returning to Australia playing in ITF and Challenger circuit. By November 2014, Whittington had reached his twentieth doubles final. Whittington ended 2014 with a singles ranking of 525 and doubles ranking of 109.

2015–2016: Focus on singles and ATP World Tour debut
In January 2015, Whittington and Bolt made the final of the Onkaparinga Challenger, before reaching the third round of the Men's doubles. Throughout the rest of 2015, Whittington began focussing on singles matches on the ATP Challenger tour, with limited success.

Whittington commenced 2016 at the Happy Valley Challenger, qualifying for and reaching the semi final. This was his best singles performance to date at this level. Whittington then played the Canberra and Launceston challenger events before winning his third and fourth ITF singles title in Mornington in March. He played in Nanjing, Anning  and Bangkok challenger events before winning his fifth ITF title in Guam in May. In June, Whittington won three ITF titles in three weeks in Hong Kong. In July, Whittington was seeded for the first time in a Challenger Event at Gimcheon and reached his first final against Max Purcell. This was followed up by a semi final result at Lexington Challenger and quarter final result at Granby. Whittington increased his singles ranking inside the top 200 for the first time. In September, Whittington contended the US Open for the first time, losing in round 1 of qualifying to João Souza. Whittington then qualified for the main draw of an ATP World Tour for the first time in Shenzhen. In his ATP debut, he saved four match points against Luca Vanni, eventually winning 2–6, 7–6, 6–2 in two hours and 20 minutes. He lost in round 2 to Richard Gasquet. Whittington ended the year playing challenger events in Vietnam and China. Whittington ended 2016 with a career high singles ranking of 170 and a doubles ranking of 312.

2017: First Grand Slam appearance
On 2 January 2017, Tennis Australia awarded Whittington a wild card into the 2017 Australian Open. This was Whittington's first singles appearance in a grand slam. He defeated Adam Pavlásek in 4 sets in round 1, before losing to Ivo Karlovic in round 2. Whittington partnered Marc Polmans in the 2017 Australian Open – Men's doubles, where they reached the semi-finals. Whittington played on the challenger tour before heading to USA in March, where he lost in qualifying for both Indian Wells and Miami Masters. At the French Open Whittington lost in round 1 of qualifying. In June, Whittington entered the qualifying for Wimbledon. In the first round of qualifying, he recovered from a 1–4 deficit in the final set, saving break points in the sixth game against Stephane Robert of France, to prevail 3–6, 7–5, 6–4. In R2 of Qualifying he won from a set down again, winning 6–7, 6–4, 6–4 against Tim Smyczek before qualifying for Wimbledon for the first time 4–6, 2–6, 7–6(7), 7–6(3), 6–0. Whittington saved two match points in the third set tie-break at 4–6 after coming from 2–5 down in that same tie-break against Denis Kudla. Whittington gallantly went down to Thiago Monteiro in R1, saving match points against his serve at 4–5 in the fourth set before losing that set and the match in a tie-break.

Personal life
Whittington supports the Essendon Football Club in the Australian Football League.
He also supports Orlando Magic in National Basketball Association.
He recently proposed to Amelia Perkins at the Seagulls Hotel in Newport which she obligingly said yes, their wedding is TBC. He has asked his father, coach mentor and best friend Alan to be his best man.

Tour finals

Singles: 14 (8–6)

Doubles: 30 (22–8)

Doubles performance timeline 

''Current through 2018 Australian Open.

References

External links
 
 
 

1993 births
Living people
Australian male tennis players
Tennis players from Melbourne
21st-century Australian people
Sportsmen from Victoria (Australia)
People from Williamstown, Victoria